Monsters of Folk is the self-titled first and only studio album by American indie rock band Monsters of Folk, a group that consists of the artists Jim James, Conor Oberst, M. Ward, and Mike Mogis. Originally slated for release in 2010, the album was released through Shangri-La Music and Rough Trade on September 22, 2009. "Dear God (sincerely M.O.F.)" samples Trevor Dandy's 1970 gospel song "Is There Any Love."

Track listing
"Dear God (Sincerely M.O.F.)" – 5:07
"Say Please" – 2:48
"Whole Lotta Losin'" – 2:45
"Temazcal" – 3:49
"The Right Place" – 3:48
"Baby Boomer" – 2:53
"Man Named Truth" – 3:51
"Goodway" – 2:01
"Ahead of the Curve" – 3:40
"Slow Down Jo" – 3:21
"Losin Yo Head" – 4:37
"Magic Marker" – 3:20
"Map of the World" – 4:24
"The Sandman, the Brakeman and Me" – 3:23
"His Master's Voice" – 4:50

Reception

Critical
Monsters of Folk was well received by critics. Music magazines Q, Mojo, and Rolling Stone each awarded the record four out of five stars. Lucas Schott of "The Tide" ranked "Monsters of Folk" the number 1 album of 2009. British newspapers The Guardian and The Times also gave the record a four out of five rating, the latter stating "this supergroup really is super." USA Today called the album a "harmonious and occasionally electrified blend of folk-rock, country and white soul."  People magazine, however, gave the album two-and-a-half out of four stars, saying "There's so much talent in this supergroup—M. Ward, My Morning Jacket's Jim James, and Bright Eyes' Conor Oberst and Mike Mogis—that you kind of expect more from them." It added, "Still, dreamy tunes like the soulful 'Dear God (Sincerely M.O.F.)' will help tame the beast within".

Commercial
Monsters of Folk debuted and peaked at number 15 on the Billboard 200, along with also charting in the Top 10 of the five other Billboard charts.

Personnel
Conor Oberst - vocals, guitar (tracks 2, 4, 5, 7, 8, 9, 13, and 15), baritone guitar (track 12), bass guitar (track 1), keyboards (tracks 3, 5, 10, and 11), drums (tracks 6 and 11), percussion (tracks 6 and 10)
Mike Mogis - guitar (tracks ), keyboards (tracks 1, 2, 4, 9, and 14), baritone guitar (tracks 3 and 7), percussion (tracks 7, 9, 10, 12, 13, and 14), mandolin (tracks 5, 7, and 8 ), drums (track 12), bass guitar (tracks 10 and 11)
Jim James - vocals, guitar (tracks 1, 5, 11, 12, 13 and 15), bass guitar (tracks 3, 4, 6, 7 and 8), keyboards (tracks 1, 3, 5, 11, 12, and 15), drums (tracks 2, 5, 9 and 15), percussion (tracks 3 and 13), programming (tracks 1 and 3)
M. Ward - vocals, guitar (tracks 1, 3, 4, 6, 7, 8, 9, 10, 11, 13, and 14), bass guitar (tracks 2, 5, and 12), keyboards (tracks 3, 9, 11, 12, 13, and 15)

Charts

References

External links

2009 debut albums
Monsters of Folk albums
Rough Trade Records albums
Shangri-La Music albums
Albums produced by Mike Mogis
Albums recorded at Shangri-La (recording studio)